The Summerland Sting was a Canadian 'B' Junior ice hockey team from Summerland, British Columbia. They played in the Kootenay International Junior Hockey League after joining during the 2001/02 season. The last season they played in was the 2008-09 KIJHL season. They relocated to Penticton, British Columbia, calling the new franchise the Penticton Lakers.  

The Sting were affiliated with the Okanagan Hockey Academy from Penticton, British Columbia.

History
The team never won any KIJHL silverware.

Season-by-season record

DNQ denotes "Did Not Qualify"

Notable alumni
Justin Keller
Justin Pogge

See also

List of ice hockey teams in British Columbia
Summerland Steam

External links
 KIJHL standings
 Official Website

References

Ice hockey teams in British Columbia
Ice hockey clubs established in 2001
Ice hockey clubs disestablished in 2009
2001 establishments in British Columbia
2009 disestablishments in British Columbia